Tropical Depression One was a tropical depression that in June 1992, produced 100-year floods in portions of southwestern Florida. The first tropical depression and second tropical cyclone of the 1992 Atlantic hurricane season, the depression developed on June 25 from a tropical wave. Located in an environment of strong wind shear, much of the convection in the system was located well to the southeast of the poorly defined center of circulation. The depression moved northeastward and made landfall near Tampa, Florida on June 26 shortly before dissipating over land.

In Cuba, the rainfall destroyed hundreds of homes and caused two fatalities. In Florida, particularly in Sarasota and Manatee counties, the rainfall caused severe flooding. 4,000 houses were affected, forcing thousands to evacuate. The flooding killed two in the state and was indirectly responsible for a traffic casualty. Damage in Florida totaled over $2.6 million (1992 USD, $4 million 2009 USD).

Meteorological history 

A weak tropical wave moved off the coast of Africa on June 12. It tracked westward across the tropical Atlantic Ocean with minimal convection, and subsequent to moving through the southern Windward Islands it crossed northern Central America. Convection increased on June 20 as the wave entered the southwestern Caribbean. Under the influence of southeasterly flow from developing Hurricane Celia in the eastern Pacific Ocean and the south-southwesterly flow from a mid-to upper-level trough over the Gulf of Mexico, the area of disturbed weather tracked generally north-northwestward through the Caribbean Sea while spreading across Cuba and southern Florida. On June 24, a mid-level circulation developed near the Yucatán Channel, and shortly thereafter satellite image loops indicated deep convection with some cyclonic rotation near the western tip of Cuba. A reconnaissance aircraft flight was dispatched late on June 24 into the system to determine if it developed into a tropical cyclone, though the flight did not observe evidence of a closed low-level circulation. Operationally, the National Hurricane Center (NHC) incorrectly classified the system as Tropical Depression Two due to an earlier subtropical storm.

Upon becoming a tropical cyclone, the depression was poorly organized, with much of the convection located well to the southeast of the broad center due to strong upper-level wind shear. The shearing environment was caused by a trough in the Gulf of Mexico and from the outflow from Pacific Hurricane Celia. This was reflected in forecasts, with the National Hurricane Center predicting no significant change in intensity or structure. The depression moved northward before turning to the northeast, and on June 26 the poorly organized system made landfall just north of Tampa, Florida. The low-level circulation dissipated while crossing the Florida peninsula, with the remnants continuing northeastward before being absorbed by a large extratropical cyclone over the western Atlantic.

Impact 

This is the fifth highest known rainfall total from a tropical cyclone in the country. The rainfall primarily affected the provinces of Pinar del Río, Matanzas, and Havana. Two Cuban citizens were killed by the rainfall, with an Arab student reported missing and presumed drowned. The deluge damaged or destroyed hundreds of houses in Pinar del Río and Havana provinces.

Officials in Manatee County declared a state of emergency in response to the flooding. There, about 3,000 people were forced to evacuate their homes due to the flooding, some of whom left by boat. The flooding damaged about 50 houses in and around Oneco. Due to the evacuations, no injuries were reported.

Damage to roads and bridges totaled about $1 million. Due to the flat landscape of the region, the flooding persisted for several days. The depression spawned a tornado in a mobile home park in Nokomis, destroying the roofs of five homes and causing leaks in twelve others. Throughout the area, the passage of the depression left about 45,000 customers without power, primarily due to gusty winds. The outages were fairly short-lived due to power companies calling in extra workers to restore the power. Moderate winds toppled a construction crane at the northern end of the Sunshine Skyway Bridge, closing the bridge for 35 minutes before the crane was removed. In Pinellas County, a man hydroplaned while driving along a flooded roadway; he crashed into a concrete pole and was killed. Severe crop damage to orange trees was reported in association with the flooding. Damage from the depression totaled over $2.6 million (1992 USD, $4 million 2008 USD), with about 4,000 houses affected by the flooding and an additional 70 destroyed. Two people were killed in Florida.

On August 14, about six weeks after the flooding, President George H. W. Bush declared a major disaster area for Charlotte, DeSoto, Manatee, and Sarasota counties. The declaration allowed for the use of federal funding to assist in the aftermath of the system.

See also 

 List of wettest tropical cyclones in Cuba since 1963
 List of Florida hurricanes

References

External links 

 NHC's archive on Tropical Depression One
 NHC's Tropical Cyclone Report on Tropical Depression One

01 1992
1992 Atlantic hurricane season
01 1992
01 1992